Narendra Bhati (born 1959) is a political leader of Bharatiya Janta Party from Uttar Pradesh, India, and representing Uttar Pradesh Legislative Council as a MLC in Uttar Pradesh and chair of UP State Agro Industrial Corporation Limited.

Early life
Born in 1958 in Bodaki village, Dadri, Gautam Budh Nagar, Bhati completed his intermediate class from Mihir Bhoj Inter College in 1977. He quickly rose through political ranks by becoming block Pramukh from Dadri in 1980. Three years later, he joined Lok Dal and won the assembly elections from Sikandrabad constituency in 1989, 1991 and 1996.
He has started his political career as a member of the Youth Congress in 1975 from Dadri block.

Positions held

References 

Living people
Uttar Pradesh politicians
Bharatiya Janata Party politicians from Uttar Pradesh
Janata Dal politicians
Samajwadi Party politicians from Uttar Pradesh
1958 births
Members of the Uttar Pradesh Legislative Council